The 2012–13 Championnat National season was the 15th season since its establishment. The previous season's champions were Nîmes. The league schedule was announced in May 2012 and the fixtures were determined on 7 July. The season began on 3 August and ended on 24 May 2013. The winter break took place from 23 December to 12 January 2013.

Teams 

There were four promoted teams from the Championnat de France amateur, replacing the four teams that were relegated from the Championnat National following the 2011–12 season. There were also three teams relegated from Ligue 2, the second division in France, replacing the clubs that were promoted to Ligue 2 from National for the 2012–13 season. A total of 20 teams competed in the league. Due to a 2010 federation ruling, beginning with the 2013–14 season, the Championnat National will downsize to 18 teams. Therefore, six clubs will suffer relegation to the fourth division, Championnat de France amateur in the 2012–13 season. All clubs that secured National status for the season were subject to approval by the DNCG before becoming eligible to participate.

Amiens was the first club to suffer relegation to the Championnat National in the 2011–12 Ligue 2 season. The club's drop was confirmed on 27 April 2012 following the team's 5–0 loss to Nantes. Amiens returned to the third division after only one season in Ligue 2. Two weeks later, Boulogne relegation to National was confirmed following the club's 2–1 defeat to Angers. Boulogne returned to the amateur level after five seasons playing at the professional level; included in those five years was a year's stint in Ligue 1. On the final day of the 2011–12 Ligue 2 season, Metz became the final club to fall to the third division following a 1–1 draw with Tours. Metz played in the Championnat National for the first time in club history having never appeared below Ligue 2 since the inception of professionalism in 1932.

On 18 May 2012, Uzès Pont du Gard became the first club from the Championnat de France amateur to earn promotion to the third division following a 1–0 win over Béziers. The club appeared in the Championnat National for the first time in its history. On the final day of the Championnat de France amateur season, CA Bastia, Bourg-Péronnas, and Carquefou all earned promotion to National after achieving positive results that made it impossible for the second-placed club in their respective groups to surpass them. Like Uzès, CA Bastia made its debut in the third division, while Carquefou and Bourg-Péronnas returned to the league after extended stays below the third division.

DNCG rulings 

On 12 June 2012, following a preliminary review of each club's administrative and financial accounts in the Championnat National, the DNCG ruled that Cherbourg would be relegated to the Championnat de France amateur due to the club possessing a financial debt of €200,000. Following the announcement, Cherbourg president Gérard Gohel announced that the club would appeal the decision. On 5 July, the DNCG reversed its decision to relegate Cherbourg after the club gained the €200,000 required to remain in the division.

Stadia and locations 

1Source:

Personnel and kits 

Note: Flags indicate national team as has been defined under FIFA eligibility rules. Players and managers may hold more than one non-FIFA nationality.

1 Subject to change prior to the start of the season.

Managerial changes

League table

Results

Season statistics

Top goalscorers

Source: Official Goalscorers' Standings

References

External links 
 

2012-13
3
France